The Red Baron was an American Christian and straight edge band, where they primarily played a hardcore punk style of music. They come from West Palm Beach, Florida. The band started making music in 2004 and disbanded in 2009.

Background
The Red Baron was a Christian hardcore band from West Palm Beach, Florida, whose lead singer was Phil Porto. They began playing as a band in 2004, only to disband in 2009.

Music history
The band commenced as a musician entity in 2004, with their only full-length album, My First Love, coming out on April 7, 2009, with Blood and Ink Records.

Discography
Studio albums
 split (with xBishopx) (2007, Dead Truth Recordings)
 My First Love (April 7, 2009, Blood and Ink)

References

External links
 MySpace profile
 Blood and Ink Records
 The Red Baron on Discogs

Musical groups from Florida
2004 establishments in Florida
2009 disestablishments in Florida
Musical groups established in 2004
Musical groups disestablished in 2009
Blood and Ink Records artists
Straight edge groups